Stockholm is the debut solo album by American singer Chrissie Hynde, lead singer of The Pretenders. It was released on June 10, 2014. It features several guests such as Canadian musician Neil Young and former tennis player John McEnroe.

Critical reception

Stockholm received mixed to positive reviews. At Metacritic, which assigns a normalized rating out of 100 to reviews from mainstream critics, the album received an average score of 64, which indicates "generally favorable reviews", based on 18 reviews.

Track listing

Personnel
Chrissie Hynde - vocals
Joakim Åhlund – guitar, producer, backing vocals
Petter Axelsson – viola
Zacharias Blad – backing vocals
Mattias Boström – electric guitar
Ulf Engström – bass, backing vocals
John Eriksson – drums, percussion
Andreas Forsman – violin
Niklas Gabrielsson – drums
Nino Keller – bass, backing vocals
Cony Lindgren – violin
John McEnroe – electric guitar
Andreas Pettersson – steel guitar
Leo Svensson – cello
Neil Young – electric guitar
Björn Yttling – electric bass, celeste, acoustic guitar, electric guitar, mellotron, organ, percussion, piano, producer, synthesizer
Technical
Gavin Goldberg – engineer
Gustav Lindelöw – engineer
Nille Perned – engineer
Hans Stenlund – engineer
Andy Wright – engineer
Lasse Mårtén – mixing
Henrik Jonsson – mastering
Thomas Kurmeier – images
Ruth Rowland – lettering
Dean Chalkley – photography

Charts

Singles

References

2014 debut albums
Caroline Records albums
Chrissie Hynde albums
Albums produced by Björn Yttling
Power pop albums by American artists